"Valley of the Shadows" is a song by English drum and bass duo Origin Unknown. Considered to be a highly influential jungle track, it was originally released as the B-side of "The Touch" before its re-release as a standalone single in 1996, both released on RAM Records. "Valley of the Shadows" proved a lot more popular than the A-side, "The Touch", and the single went on to become one of the label's best-selling releases.

Background
Two vocal samples are used extensively throughout the track. The phrase "Felt that I was in this long dark tunnel" was sampled from an episode of the BBC documentary series Q.E.D., first shown in 1988, concerning out-of-body experiences; and the phrase "Thirty-one seconds" was from the Apollo 11 countdown to the Lunar Module landing on the moon in 1969 (as voiced by then-Kennedy Space Center Chief of Public Information Jack King). Most of the drum sounds were sampled from the free CD from the first issues of the magazine Future Music in the UK in February 1993. The track was recorded in four hours, and despite being placed on the B-side as it didn't fit the mould of most breakbeat hardcore tracks at the time, it became one of the biggest-selling and most enduring releases on the label.

The title is perhaps inspired by Psalm 23 in the Bible, but is probably more likely to be a reference to "The Valley of the Shadow of Death" in John Bunyan's The Pilgrim's Progress, which, in turn, is inspired by the Psalm.

Formats and track listings

Charts

References

External links
Origin Unknown 'Valley Of The Shadows' (Game Changer Documentary) on Dailymotion

1993 songs
RAM Records singles